Jean-Emmanuel is a French compound given name, a combination of Jean and Emmanuel. Notable people with the name include:

 Jean-Emmanuel Cassin, French rugby football player
 Jean-Emmanuel Gilibert (1741-1814), French politician, botanist, freemason and medical doctor
 Jean-Emmanuel Effa Owona (born 1983), Cameroonian football player

French masculine given names
Compound given names